South Atlantic Pro Wrestling (SAPW, formerly known as the North American Wrestling Association) was a professional wrestling promotion founded by George Scott, John Ringley and Mike Lamberth in Charlotte, North Carolina in 1990, and later taken over by Paul Jones and Frank Dusek. It was the last effort to revive the NWA's Mid-Atlantic wrestling territory.

History and overview

Formation
The North American Wrestling Association was founded by George Scott, John Ringley and Mike Lamberth in January 1990. The first event and TV taping was held in Sumter, South Carolina on February 8, 1990. Matches from these shows were first shown in March and April 1990.

The first North American Heavyweight Champion, Robert Fuller, won the championship in an 18-man tournament by defeating Ricky Steamboat in the finals on June 30, 1990, in Winston-Salem, North Carolina. The first North American Tag Team Champions were crowned in a tournament final that same month, also in Winston-Salem, when The Nasty Boys defeated Danny Allen and Bob Emery.

Scott and Ringley, as former Jim Crockett Promotions employees, recognized the importance of television exposure. The group purchased all the old JCP market stations in the Carolinas along with the original timeslots. In July 1990, Paul Jones and Frank Dusek took over the promotion and negotiated a deal with the America One Network to air "South Atlantic Pro Wrestling" on Friday nights later that year.

Territorial reach
George Scott and his partners hoped to revive the National Wrestling Alliance's old Mid-Atlantic wrestling territory which traditionally covered Virginia, North Carolina and South Carolina. After securing key television markets in the Carolinas, the promotion signed contracts with all the old Crockett arenas to hold pro wrestling shows on a regular basis. Within the first year of operation, house shows and TV tapings were held at the Columbia Township Auditorium, Grady Cole Center, Greenwood Civic Center, Limestone College Gym, and the Winston-Salem Memorial Coliseum. SAPW tours also included high school gyms, rec centers, and fairs in cities throughout Georgia, Mississippi, Virginia, and the Carolinas. In August 1991, SAPW held a benefit show in Wentworth, North Carolina for Operation Family Shield, a support group established by then Governor Jim Martin, that provided financial assistance to military families of  North Carolina National Guardsmen and U.S. Army reservists stationed in the Persian Gulf.

Notable talent
SAPW featured many Mid-Atlantic veterans such as Big John Studd, Bob Orton Jr., Ivan Koloff, Junkyard Dog, Manny Fernandez, Matt Bourne, Paul Jones, Randy Colley, Ricky Steamboat, Robert Fuller, Ron Garvin, Tommy Rich, Wahoo McDaniel, and The Fantastics. Other legends such as Lou Thesz, Johnny Weaver, and Tim Woods appeared alongside SAPW announcer Ted Webb as special guest commentators for "South Atlantic Pro Wrestling". Bob Caudle also joined the promotion in late 1991. Henry Marcus, another longtime JCP associate, promoted his final house show for the group.

The promotion also showcased younger talent, including Baron Samdi, Curtis Thompson, Dean Malenko, Nelson Frazier, The Patriot, P. N. News, Ric Savage, Rob Van Dam, Vince Torelli, The American Pit Bulldogs and The Nasty Boys. Chris Chavis, who had trained under Larry Sharpe at the Monster Factory prior to his SAPW debut, was its first breakout star. During his first year in SAPW, he was voted 3rd runner up for Rookie of the Year in Pro Wrestling Illustrated. Chavis was also awarded the SAPW Heavyweight Championship before being signed to the World Wrestling Federation. Chavis attributed his early success to Ricky Steamboat and Wahoo McDaniel who mentored him during his time in SAPW.

Style and controversy
SAPW catered to traditional Southern wrestling fans that had grown up during the Mid-Atlantic territory's "glory years" of previous decades. The promoters promised a back-to-basics approach to pro wrestling that provided an alternative to "sports entertainment" marketed by the World Wrestling Federation. They were also critical of the independent promotions beginning to emerge with the weakening of the NWA. Its "family friendly" environment was not without controversy, however, as a real-life fight between Ken Shamrock and The Nasty Boys left the future UFC fighter hospitalized. The drunken brawl had reportedly woken up other wrestlers staying in the motel. Frank Dusek claimed that it was only the intervention of Robert Fuller and the American Pit Bulldogs (Rex and Spike) that prevented Kobbs and Saggs from throwing the unconscious wrestler over the third floor balcony of their motel room. Shamrock suffered a broken sternum and a caved in eye socket as a result of the two-on-one attack.

World Wrestling Council
The promotion had a brief association with the World Wrestling Council after Manny Fernandez became SAPW's booker in August 1991. In November of that year, Fernandez was "suspended" from the promotion when he took the SAPW Heavyweight Championship to Puerto Rico. This led to a cross promotional effort with the WWC which saw Fernandez defend the belt as the "WWC North America Champion".

Demise
In spite of a strong start, the promotion operated at a loss during its first six months in business. George Scott lost an estimated $600,000 before deciding to cut his losses and retire to Florida. There was a noticeable drop in quality after the original investors pulled out and many of the promotion's top stars left the area. "South Atlantic Pro Wrestling" remained in the Friday night death slot throughout its two-year run. Jones and Dusek eventually sold SAPW to North Carolina promoter Greg Price who ran the promotion during its final year. Its last official show was held in Cerro Gordo, North Carolina on August 1, 1992.

Alumni
Male wrestlers

Female wrestlers

Stables and tag teams

Managers and valets

Commentators and interviewers

Referees

Other personnel

Championships

SAPW Heavyweight Championship

SAPW Junior Heavyweight Championship

SAPW United States Heavyweight Championship

SAPW Women's Championship

SAPW Tag Team Championship

References

External links
South Atlantic Pro Wrestling at Cagematch.net
South Atlantic Pro Wrestling at Wrestlingdata.com

Independent professional wrestling promotions based in North Carolina
National Wrestling Alliance members